is a term used on Japanese Internet forums for East Asian countries who feel that they exhibit certain anti-Japanese sentiment or involvement in political tensions and disputes with Japan, namely, South Korea, North Korea and China. 

The term tokutei Asia is used by Japanese nationalist internet users who don't like South Korea, North Korea and China. It's generally regarded as a disparaging term, and its use is limited to certain far-right circles, most notably the netto-uyoku.

See also 
 East Asia
 Internet slang
 Yoshiko Sakurai (originator)
 Netto-uyoku

References 

Japanese words and phrases
East Asian culture
Anti-Japanese sentiment